This is a list of victories of the  cycling team. The races are categorized according to the UCI Continental Circuits rules.

1996 – Gaseosas Glacial–Selle Italia

1997 – Kross–Selle Italia

1998 – Kross–Selle Italia

1999 – Selle Italia

2000 – Aguardiente Néctar–Selle Italia

Stage 10 Vuelta al Táchira, Rubén Marín
Stage 11 Vuelta al Táchira, Jairo Pérez
Stage 2 Tour de Langkawi, Jamie Drew
Stage 4 Vuelta Ciclista de Chile, Israel Ochoa
Tour du Lac Léman, Andris Naudužs
Stages 1, 2, 3 & 4 Vuelta a Colombia, Andris Naudužs
Stages 6 & 15 Vuelta a Colombia, Raúl Montaña
Stages 9 & 14 Vuelta a Colombia, Jairo Pérez
Stage 13 Vuelta a Colombia, Rubén Marín
Prologue (ITT) Clásico RCN, Libardo Niño
Stage 7 Clásico RCN, Elkin Barrera
Overall Tour du Faso, Mikhaylo Khalilov
Stages 1 & 4, Dimitri Pavi Degl'Innocenti
Stages 2, 3, 8, 10 & 11, Mikhaylo Khalilov
Stage 5, Csaba Szekeres
Stage 6a, Guido Trombetta
Stage 7a, Team time trial
 Time Trial Championships, Israel Ochoa

2001 – Selle Italia–Pacific

Stausee-Rundfahrt Klingnau, Andris Naudužs
Stage 2 Tour du Maroc, Jhon García
Stage 14 Giro d'Italia, Carlos Alberto Contreras
 Overall Vuelta a Colombia, Hernán Buenahora
Stages 7, 8, 10 & 16, Hernán Buenahora
Stages 2 & 7 Clásico RCN, José Castelblanco
Stage 8 Clásico RCN, Fredy González
Trofeo dello Scalatore III, Fredy González
 Time Trial Championships, Kristjan Snorrasson
Overall Perlis Open, Kristjan Snorrasson
Stages 1 & 2, Kristjan Snorrasson

2002 – Colombia–Selle Italia

Stage 5 Vuelta al Táchira, Carlos Ibáñez
Stage 10 Vuelta al Táchira, Fidel Chacón
 Overall Tour de Langkawi, Hernán Darío Muñoz
Stage 9, Hernán Darío Muñoz
 Road Race Championships, Jhon García
 Overall Vuelta a Colombia, José Castelblanco
Stages 5 & 10, José Castelblanco
Stage 12, Hernán Darío Muñoz
Stage 14, Jhon García
Overall Clásico RCN, José Castelblanco
Stages 2 & 6, Fredy González
Stage 5, Fidel Chacón
Stage 8, José Castelblanco
Stages 2 & 4 Tour of Bulgaria, Andris Naudužs
Stage 6 Tour of Bulgaria, Mikhaylo Khalilov
Stage 7 Tour of Bulgaria, Denis Sosnovtchenko
Overall Tour du Sénégal, Andris Naudužs
Prologue (ITT) & Stage 5, Fidel Chacón
Stages 1 & 10, Andris Naudužs
Stages 2 & 7, Leonardo Scarselli
Stages 3 & 8, Denis Sosnovtchenko
Stage 4, Vladimir Lobzov

2003 – Colombia–Selle Italia

 Overall Vuelta al Táchira, Hernán Darío Muñoz
Stage 6, Rubén Marín
Stages 8 & 13, Hernán Darío Muñoz
Stage 9 Tour de Langkawi, Hernán Darío Muñoz
Gp Knorr, Raffaele Illiano
Stage 13 Vuelta a Colombia, Huberlino Mesa
Overall Clásico RCN, José Castelblanco
Stage 4, José Rujano
Stage 7, José Castelblanco

2004 – Colombia–Selle Italia

 Overall Vuelta al Táchira, José Rujano
Stages 1, 3 & 14, Marlon Pérez
Stages 5 & 13, José Rujano
Stage 8 & 12, Fredy González
 Overall Tour de Langkawi, Fredy González
Stage 2, Marlon Pérez
Stage 9, Rubén Marín
Grand Prix Bradlo, Raffaele Illiano
Stage 8 Vuelta a Venezuela, Fredy González
Overall Tour du Sénégal, Mariano Giallorenzo
Prologue (ITT), Stages 6 & 8, Raffaele Illiano
Stages 2, 5 & 7, Denis Sosnovtchenko

2005 – Colombia–Selle Italia

 Overall Vuelta al Táchira, José Rujano
Stages 6, 7 & 13, José Rujano
 Time Trial Championships, Iván Parra
Stages 13 & 14 Giro d'Italia, Iván Parra
Stage 19 Giro d'Italia, José Rujano
 Mountains classification in the Giro d'Italia, José Rujano
Stage 2 Vuelta a Colombia, Nilton Ortíz
Stages 1 & 7 Vuelta a Venezuela, Moreno Di Biase
Stage 2 Vuelta a Venezuela, Jesús Pérez
Stages 4 & 10a Vuelta a Venezuela, Marlon Pérez
Overall Clásico Ciclistico Banfoandes, José Rujano
Stages 4, 7 & 8, José Rujano

2006 – Selle Italia–Serramenti Diquigiovanni

Stages 4 & 5 Tour de Langkawi, José Serpa
Prologue (ITT) Vuelta por un Chile Lider, Edgardo Simón
Stages 4, 7, 8a & 10, Vuelta por un Chile Lider, Alberto Loddo
Stage 6 Vuelta por un Chile Lider, José Serpa
Stage 4 Circuit de la Sarthe, Alberto Loddo
Stage 5 Circuit de la Sarthe, Alessandro Bertolini
Stage 7 Vuelta a Colombia, Walter Pedraza
Stage 12 Vuelta a Colombia, José Serpa
 Overall Vuelta a Venezuela, José Serpa
Stage 4, José Serpa
Coppa Ugo Agostoni, Alessandro Bertolini
Giro della Romagna, Santo Anzà

2007 – Serramenti PVC Diquigiovanni–Selle Italia

Stage 1 Vuelta al Táchira, Alberto Loddo
Stage 5 Vuelta al Táchira, José Serpa
Stage 10 Vuelta al Táchira, Walter Pedraza
Stages 1, 4, 5, 6 & 10, Tour de Langkawi, Alberto Loddo
Stage 8 Tour de Langkawi, José Serpa
Prologue (ITT) & Stages 4, 5 & 6 Vuelta por un Chile Lider, Edgardo Simón
Stage 9 Vuelta por un Chile Lider, Walter Pedraza
Stage 10 Vuelta por un Chile Lider, Anthony Brea
Stage 1a Settimana Internazionale di Coppi e Bartali, Alessandro Bertolini
Stage 1 Vuelta a La Rioja, Alberto Loddo
Stage 2 Vuelta a Asturias, Alberto Loddo
 Overall Tour of Qinghai Lake, Gabriele Missaglia
Giro dell'Appennino, Alessandro Bertolini
Coppa Ugo Agostoni, Alessandro Bertolini
Trofeo Melinda, Santo Anzà
Giro del Veneto, Alessandro Bertolini
Coppa Placci, Alessandro Bertolini
Stage 6 Vuelta a Venezuela, Emiliano Donadello

2008 – Serramenti PVC Diquigiovanni–Androni Giocattoli

Stage 4 Tour de San Luis, Carlos José Ochoa
 Overall Tour de Langkawi, Ruslan Ivanov
Stage 4, Danilo Hondo
Stage 6, José Serpa
Stage 2 Tirreno–Adriatico, Raffaele Illiano
Stage 2 Settimana Internazionale di Coppi e Bartali, Niklas Axelsson
Stage 1 Volta ao Alentejo, Jackson Rodríguez
Stage 11 Giro d'Italia, Alessandro Bertolini
 Overall Brixia Tour, Santo Anzà
Stage 4, Santo Anzà
Gran Premio Industria e Commercio Artigianato Carnaghese, Francesco Ginanni
Giro dell'Appennino, Alessandro Bertolini
Tre Valli Varesine, Francesco Ginanni
 Overall Vuelta a Venezuela, Carlos José Ochoa
Stage 2, Jackson Rodríguez
Stage 5, Carlos José Ochoa
Stage 7, Richard Ochoa
Stage 9, José Serpa
 Overall Clasico Ciclistico Banfoandes, José Serpa
Stage 1, Manuel Belletti
Stages 6 & 7, José Serpa

2009 – Serramenti PVC Diquigiovanni–Androni Giocattoli

Stage 1 Tour de San Luis, Mattia Gavazzi
Stage 4 Tour de San Luis, José Serpa
 Overall Tour de Langkawi, José Serpa
Stages 1, 2, 3 & 6, Mattia Gavazzi
Stage 5, José Serpa
Stages 3 & 4 Vuelta a Andalucía, Davide Rebellin
Trofeo Laigueglia, Francesco Ginanni
Gran Premio dell'Insubria-Lugano, Francesco Ginanni
 Overall Vuelta Mexico Telmex, Jackson Rodríguez
Stage 2, Jackson Rodríguez
Stage 3, Gilberto Simoni
 Overall Tirreno–Adriatico, Michele Scarponi
Stage 6, Michele Scarponi
Stage 3 Settimana Ciclistica Lombarda, Mattia Gavazzi
La Flèche Wallonne, Davide Rebellin
Stages 6 & 18 Giro d'Italia, Michele Scarponi
Stages 1 & 2 Vuelta a Venezuela, Alberto Loddo
Stages 3a, 3b & 4 Vuelta a Venezuela, Mattia Gavazzi
Stage 7 Vuelta a Venezuela, José Serpa
 Time Trial Championship, Rubens Bertogliati
Stagse 1a & 5 Brixia Tour, Mattia Gavazzi
Stage 2 Brixia Tour, Leonardo Bertagnolli
Gran Premio Industria e Commercio Artigianato Carnaghese, Francesco Ginanni

2010 – Androni Giocattoli

Stages 3 & 7 Tour de San Luis, Alberto Loddo
Stage 5 Tour de San Luis, Jackson Rodríguez
Stage 6 Tour de San Luis, Luis Ángel Maté
Trofeo Laigueglia, Francesco Ginanni
Stage 5 Giro di Sardegna, Alberto Loddo
Stage 4 Tirreno–Adriatico, Michele Scarponi
Stage 2 Settimana Internazionale di Coppi e Bartali, José Serpa
 Overall Settimana Ciclistica Lombarda, Michele Scarponi
Prologue (ITT), Michele Scarponi
Stage 4, José Serpa
Stage 3 Giro del Trentino, Alessandro Bertolini
Stage 19 Giro d'Italia, Michele Scarponi
 Time Trial Championship, Rubens Bertogliati
Stage 3 Tour of Austria, Leonardo Bertagnolli

2011 – Androni Giocattoli

Stages 1 & 3 Tour de San Luis, Roberto Ferrari
Stage 2 Tour de San Luis, José Serpa
 Overall Tour de Langkawi, Jonathan Monsalve
Stage 5, Jonathan Monsalve
Giro del Friuli, José Serpa
 Overall Settimana Internazionale di Coppi e Bartali, Emanuele Sella
Stage 1b, Team time trial
Stage 3, Emanuele Sella
GP Industria & Artigianato di Larciano
Stage 3 Giro d'Italia, Ángel Vicioso
Stages 9 & 13 Giro d'Italia, José Rujano

2012 – Androni Giocattoli–Venezuela

 Road Race Championships, Franco Pellizotti
 Road Race Championships, Miguel Ubeto
 Time Trial Championships, Tomás Gil
 Overall Tour de Langkawi, José Serpa
Stages 5 & 6, José Serpa
Stage 5 Tour de Taiwan, Roberto Ferrari
Route Adélie, Roberto Ferrari
Flèche d'Emeraude, Roberto Ferrari
Giro dell'Appennino, Fabio Felline
Stage 6 Giro d'Italia, Miguel Ángel Rubiano
Stage 11 Giro d'Italia, Roberto Ferrari
 Overall Vuelta a Venezuela, Miguel Ubeto
Stage 5, Jackson Rodríguez
Coppa Ugo Agostoni, Emanuele Sella
Memorial Marco Pantani, Fabio Felline
Gran Premio Industria e Commercio di Prato, Emanuele Sella

2013 – Androni Giocattoli–Venezuela

Stage 7 Tour de San Luis, Mattia Gavazzi
Stage 1a Settimana Internazionale di Coppi e Bartali, Fabio Felline
Route Adélie, Alessandro Malaguti
Giro di Toscana, Mattia Gavazzi
Stage 2 Tour of Slovenia, Fabio Felline
Stage 4 Route du Sud, Marco Frapporti
Stage 8 Tour of Austria, Omar Bertazzo
Stage 3b Sibiu Cycling Tour, Mattia Gavazzi
 Overall Vuelta a Venezuela, Carlos José Ochoa
Stage 3, Mattia Gavazzi
Stages 6 & 9, Jackson Rodríguez
Gran Premio Industria e Commercio di Prato, Gianfranco Zilioli

2014 – Androni Giocattoli–Venezuela

Stage 6 Tour de Langkawi, Kenny van Hummel
Stage 1 Tour d'Azerbaïdjan, Kenny van Hummel
 Under-23 National Time Trial Championships, Yonder Godoy
Stage 6 Vuelta a Venezuela, Carlos Gálviz
Stage 10 Vuelta a Venezuela, Kenny van Hummel
Stage 4 Tour du Limousin, Manuel Belletti

2015 – Androni–Sidermec

Stage 5 Vuelta al Táchira, Carlos Gálviz
Stage 3 Settimana Internazionale di Coppi e Bartali, Francesco Chicchi
Stage 6 Vuelta a Venezuela, Francesco Chicchi
 National Time Trial Championships, Yonder Godoy
 National Time Trial Championships, Serghei Țvetcov
 National Road Race Championships, Serghei Țvetcov
Stages 1 & 4 Cycling Tour of Sibiu, Oscar Gatto
Stage 3 Cycling Tour of Sibiu, Alessio Taliani
Stage 3a (ITT) Tour of Szeklerland, Serghei Țvetcov

2016 – Androni Giocattoli–Sidermec

 Overall Tour of Bihor, Egan Bernal
Stage 1, Egan Bernal
Stages 2 & 3, Marco Benfatto
Stage 1 Boucles de la Mayenne, Francesco Chicchi
Stage 4 Sibiu Cycling Tour, Davide Viganò
Stage 2 Volta a Portugal, Francesco Gavazzi
 Overall Tour of China I, Raffaello Bonusi
Stages 1, 2 & 6, Marco Benfatto
Stage 3, Raffaello Bonusi
Stage 4, Mattia De Marchi
Memorial Marco Pantani, Francesco Gavazzi
 Overall Tour of China II, Marco Benfatto
Stages 1, 4 & 5, Marco Benfatto

2017 – Androni–Sidermec–Bottecchia

Stage 1 Vuelta al Táchira, Raffaello Bonusi
Stage 3 Tour de la Provence, Mattia Cattaneo
Stage 7 Tour de Bretagne, Andrea Vendrame
Stage 1 Tour du Jura, Marco Frapporti
 Overall Tour of Bihor, Rodolfo Torres
Stages 1 & 3, Matteo Malucelli
Stage 2a, Rodolfo Torres
Stage 2 Tour de Slovaquie, Matteo Malucelli
 Overall Tour de Savoie Mont-Blanc, Egan Bernal
Stages 2 & 4 (ITT), Egan Bernal
 Overall Sibiu Cycling Tour, Egan Bernal
Prologue, Andrea Palini
Stages 2 & 3, Egan Bernal
Stage 1 Tour of China I, Luca Pacioni
Stage 5 Tour of China I, Marco Benfatto
 Overall Tour of China II, Kevin Rivera
Stage 1 Tour of China II, Kevin Rivera

2018 – Androni–Sidermec–Bottecchia

Stages 1 & 3 Vuelta al Táchira, Matteo Malucelli
Stage 4 Vuelta al Táchira, Iván Sosa
Stage 7 Vuelta al Táchira, Kevin Rivera
Stage 7 Tour de Langkawi, Manuel Belletti
Stage 2 Tour de Bretagne, Matteo Malucelli
Stage 2 Vuelta a Aragón, Matteo Malucelli
 Overall Tour of Bihor, Iván Sosa
Stage 1, Matteo Malucelli
Stage 2a, Iván Sosa
 Overall Adriatica Ionica Race, Iván Sosa
Stage 3, Iván Sosa
 Overall Sibiu Cycling Tour, Iván Sosa
Prologue, Davide Ballerini
Stage 1, Iván Sosa
 Overall Vuelta Ciclista a Venezuela, Matteo Spreafico
Stage 1, Matteo Malucelli
Stage 4, Marco Benfatto
Stage 5 (ITT), Matteo Spreafico
 Overall Vuelta a Burgos, Iván Sosa
Stage 5, Iván Sosa
 Overall Tour de Hongrie, Manuel Belletti
Stage 1, Manuel Belletti
Stage 1 Tour of China I, Matteo Malucelli
Stages 3 & 5 Tour of China I, Marco Benfatto
Stage 3 Tour of China II, Seid Lizde
Memorial Marco Pantani, Davide Ballerini
Trofeo Matteotti, Davide Ballerini
 Overall Tour of Hainan, Fausto Masnada
Stages 3, 5 & 7, Manuel Belletti
Stage 8, Fausto Masnada
Tour de Langkawi
Stage 5 & 6, Matteo Pelucchi
Stage 8, Marco Benfatto

2019 – Androni Giocattoli–Sidermec

Stage 1 Vuelta al Táchira, Marco Benfatto
Stage 8 Vuelta al Táchira, Miguel Flórez
Stage 2 Giro di Sicilia, Manuel Belletti
Stages 5, 6 & 8 Tour de Langkawi, Matteo Pelucchi
Stage 4 Circuit Cycliste Sarthe–Pays de la Loire, Andrea Vendrame
Tro-Bro Léon, Andrea Vendrame
Stages 3 & 5 Tour of the Alps, Fausto Masnada
Stage 1 Tour de Bretagne, Manuel Belletti
Giro dell'Appennino, Mattia Cattaneo
Stage 6 Giro d'Italia, Fausto Masnada
Stage 3 Vuelta a Aragón, Matteo Pelucchi
 Overall Cycling Tour of Bihor, Daniel Muñoz
Stage 2b, Daniel Muñoz
 National Time Trial Championships, Josip Rumac
 National Road Race Championships, Josip Rumac
Stage 1 Tour de Hongrie, Manuel Belletti
 Overall Sibiu Cycling Tour, Kevin Rivera
Stage 2, Kevin Rivera 
Stage 4 Tour du Limousin, Francesco Gavazzi
Stage 3 Tour Poitou-Charentes en Nouvelle Aquitaine, Matteo Pelucchi
Stage 1 & 5 Tour of China I, Marco Benfatto
Stage 1 & 2 Tour of China II, Marco Benfatto
Stage 3 Tour of China II, Kevin Rivera
Stages 1 & 6 Tour of Taihu Lake, Marco Benfatto
Stages 2 & 4 Tour of Taihu Lake, Matteo Pelucchi

2020 – Androni Giocattoli–Sidermec

Stage 1 Vuelta al Táchira, Luca Pacioni 
Stages 3 & 5 Vuelta al Táchira, Jhonatan Restrepo 
Stages 6 (ITT) & 7 Vuelta al Táchira, Kevin Rivera 
Stage 5 Vuelta a San Juan, Miguel Flórez
Stage 4 Tour de Langkawi, Kevin Rivera 
Stages 3, 5, 6 & 7 (ITT) Tour of Rwanda, Jhonatan Restrepo
 National Time Trial Championships, Josip Rumac
 National Road Race Championships, Josip Rumac

2021 – Androni Giocattoli–Sidermec

Stage 1 Vuelta al Táchira, Matteo Malucelli
Stage 8 Vuelta al Táchira, Simon Pellaud
Stage 7 (ITT) Tour du Rwanda, Jhonatan Restrepo
 National Road Race Championships, Jefferson Alexander Cepeda
 National Road Race Championships, Andrii Ponomar
Stage 3 Tour Alsace, Santiago Umba
 Overall Tour de Savoie Mont-Blanc, Jefferson Alexander Cepeda
Stage 1, Santiago Umba
Stage 2, Jefferson Alexander Cepeda
Prologue Tour of Romania, János Pelikán
Stage 3 Tour of Romania, Daniel Muñoz
Stage 5 Tour de Bretagne, Leonardo Marchiori

2022 – Drone Hopper–Androni Giocattoli

Stage 8 Vuelta al Táchira, Didier Merchán
 Overall Tour du Rwanda, Natnael Tesfatsion
Stage 3, Jhonatan Restrepo
Stage 4 Tour of Turkey, Eduardo Sepúlveda
Stage 2 Adriatica Ionica Race, Natnael Tesfatsion
Stage 3 Tour of Romania, Eduard-Michael Grosu

2023 – GW Shimano-Sidermec

Stage 3 Vuelta al Táchira, Jonathan Guatibonza

Supplementary statistics
Sources

1996 to 2016

2017 to present

Notes

References

Drone Hopper–Androni Giocattoli
Gaseosas